The 2011 Turkmenistan Higher League (Ýokary Liga) season was the nineteenth season of Turkmenistan's professional football league. It began on 2 April 2011 with the first round of games and will end in November.

Teams
Talyp Sporty Aşgabat were relegated. FC Gara Altyn as champions of the Turkmen second level of football were promoted. FC Balkan were renamed back to FC Nebitçi, then again back to FC Balkan within a week.

League table

Positions by round

Results

First half of season

Second half of season

References

External links
 2011 Ýokary Liga at Soccerway 
 Official news site 
 Asian Football Confederation 

Ýokary Liga seasons
Turk
Turk
1